Tillandsia organensis is a species in the genus Tillandsia. This species is endemic to Brazil.

References

organensis
Endemic flora of Brazil